South Point is a village in Lawrence County, Ohio, United States, along the Ohio River. South Point straddles Perry Township and Fayette Township. The population was 3,958 at the 2010 census.

South Point is a part of the Huntington-Ashland, WV-KY-OH, Metropolitan Statistical Area (MSA). As of the 2000 census, the MSA had a population of 288,649.

The village mayor is Jeff Gaskin, who was elected in November 2015.

History
A post office called South Point has been in operation since 1855 in Fayette Township. The village was so named for the fact the southernmost point in the state is contained within its borders. Now considered to be a populated place within South Point, in 1918 the community of North Kenova was located at (38.412, -82.578), so named because it was on the opposite bank of the Ohio River from Kenova, West Virginia.

Geography
South Point is located at  (38.419289, -82.580579). The village lies at the junction point of the three states of Ohio, West Virginia, and Kentucky. Not far from the village lies the southernmost point in the State of Ohio, along the Ohio River less than one mile east of the village's southeast corner.

Climate

Demographics

2010 census
As of the census of 2010, there were 3,958 people, 1,602 households, and 1,132 families living in the village. The racial makeup of the village was 94.2% White, 3.2% African American, 0.1% Native American, 0.5% Asian, 0.2% from other races, and 1.8% from two or more races. Hispanic or Latino of any race were 0.4% of the population.

There were 1,602 households, of which 33.0% had children under the age of 18 living with them, 53.1% were married couples living together, 12.1% had a female householder with no husband present, 5.5% had a male householder with no wife present, and 29.3% were non-families. 25.4% of all households were made up of individuals, and 10.5% had someone living alone who was 65 years of age or older. The average household size was 2.47 and the average family size was 2.92.

The median age in the village was 40.3 years. 23.3% of residents were under the age of 18; 7.4% were between the ages of 18 and 24; 25.2% were from 25 to 44; 26.8% were from 45 to 64; and 17.3% were 65 years of age or older. The gender makeup of the village was 46.8% male and 53.2% female.

2000 census
As of the census of 2000, there were 3,742 people, 1,485 households, and 1,131 families living in the village. The population density was 1,547.0 people per square mile (597.0/km). There were 1,564 housing units at an average density of 646.6 per square mile (249.5/km). The racial makeup of the village was 95.91% White, 2.27% African American, 0.08% Native American, 0.16% Asian, 0.03% Pacific Islander, and 1.55% from two or more races. Hispanic or Latino of any race were 0.32% of the population.

There were 1,485 households, out of which 31.0% had children under the age of 18 living with them, 61.8% were married couples living together, 10.2% had a female householder with no husband present, and 23.8% were non-families. 21.1% of all households were made up of individuals, and 8.4% had someone living alone who was 65 years of age or older. The average household size was 2.52 and the average family size was 2.89.

In the village, the population was spread out, with 23.1% under the age of 18, 8.3% from 18 to 24, 27.8% from 25 to 44, 25.5% from 45 to 64, and 15.3% who were 65 years of age or older. The median age was 39 years. For every 100 females, there were 89.9 males. For every 100 females age 18 and over, there were 89.4 males.

The median income for a household in the village was $33,110, and the median income for a family was $34,560. Males had a median income of $32,439 versus $21,496 for females. The per capita income for the village was $15,296. About 9.0% of families and 11.3% of the population were below the poverty line, including 17.2% of those under age 18 and 3.7% of those age 65 or over.

Government and politics 
The village is managed by a six-member city council, the current members of which include Chuck Austin, Brad Adkins, Mary Cogan, Mike Lynd, Marlene Arthur, and David Classings. The elected mayor is Jeff Gaskin.

Education
The South Point Local School District serves the village and nearby unincorporated areas.  Beginning in March 2004, the district embarked on a project to construct all new school buildings, including demolishing certain buildings: the location of the old middle and high schools is the location of the new South Point Elementary School, while the location of the new Burlington Elementary School is the same as that of the old.

South Point has a public library, a branch of Briggs Lawrence County Public Library.

See also
 List of cities and towns along the Ohio River
 North Bend, Ohio, the most northerly point on the Ohio River

References

External links
 
 South Point Local Schools

Villages in Lawrence County, Ohio
Villages in Ohio
Ohio populated places on the Ohio River